Aon or AON may refer to:

 Aon (mythology), son of Poseidon in Greek mythology
 Aon (moth), a genus of moths in the family Erebidae
 Aon (trigraph), a Latin trigraph
 "Aon", a composition by jazz pianist Harold Mabern,  1968

Business and administration
 Aon (company), a global professional services firm
 Aon Training Complex, the sponsored name of Trafford Training Centre
 Aon Center, the name of two buildings:
 Aon Center (Chicago)
 Aon Center (Los Angeles)
 Precedence diagram method or activity on node, a type of diagram in: 
 Program evaluation and review technique

Entertainment
 Aon, the fantasy universe setting of the role-playing game Lone Wolf series
 All or Nothing (sports docuseries), a brand of sports documentary series distributed on the Amazon Prime Video platform
 Art of Noise, a British electronic music group

Other uses
 All or none (finance), a condition to fulfil an investor's order in its entirety or cancel it
 Alton railway station, from its National Rail code
 Angolan kwanza, from its ISO currency code
 Application-oriented networking, a computer networking technology
 All-optical network, see Synchronous optical networking
 Active optical network, a form of fiber-optic communication delivery

See also 
 Aion (disambiguation)
 Aeon (disambiguation)
 Eon (disambiguation)